Abid Hussain Bhayo is a Pakistani politician who has been a Member of the National Assembly of Pakistan since August 2018. Previously he was a member of the Provincial Assembly of Sindh, from August 2013 to May 2018.

Political career
He was elected to the Provincial Assembly of Sindh as a candidate of Pakistan Peoples Party (PPP) from Constituency PS-12 Shikarpur-II in by-polls held in August 2013.

He was elected to the National Assembly of Pakistan as a candidate of PPP from Constituency NA-198 (Shikarpur-I) in 2018 Pakistani general election.

References

Living people
Sindh MPAs 2013–2018
Pakistan People's Party politicians
Pakistani MNAs 2018–2023
Year of birth missing (living people)